In geometry, an eleven-point conic is a conic associated to four points and a line, containing 11 special points.

References
. Reprinted in 2010.

External links
Eleven-point conic

Projective geometry
Conic sections